First Reserve Corporation is a private equity firm specializing in leveraged buyouts and growth capital investments in the energy sector.  First Reserve was founded in 1984 and is the oldest and largest private equity fund dedicated to investments in the energy sector.

As of 2017, First Reserve had approximately 155 employees across three offices in Stamford, Connecticut, Houston, Texas and London.

Investments
The firm is currently investing out of its twelfth private equity fund First Reserve Fund XII LP, raised in 2008 with approximately $8.9 billion of investor commitments, which is the largest energy-focused fund raised to that point.  Fund XI was raised in 2006 with $7.8 billion of investor commitments. Fund XI was more than $5.5 billion larger (and three times the size) of Fund X which closed with $2.3 billion in 2004.  First Reserve's fundraising has benefited from the recent focus on the energy industry in the broader market.

In 2008, First Reserve advanced its renewable energy investment program with the €261 million acquisition of Gamesa Solar.  Additionally, First Reserve committed €600 million to form a European renewable energy group with the ability to deliver solar capacity of up to 400 MW in Southern Europe by 2012.  Among First Reserve's most notable transactions in the traditional energy sector include:

 PBF Energy, 2008
 CHC Helicopter, 2008
 Brand Services, 2007
 Dresser-Rand, 2004
 Pride International, 1999
 Enterra Corporation, 1994

Other notes
In September 2006, First Reserve Corporation Chairman and Chief Executive Officer William E. Macaulay donated $30 million to the City University of New York (the largest single donation in the history of CUNY) to endow The William E. Macaulay Honors College.

In 2002 affiliates of the company helped establish Alpha Natural Resources which has since become one of the largest US coal companies.

References

External links

First Reserve Corporation Profile BusinessWeek
 Dresser, Inc. profile Hoovers.com

Financial services companies established in 1984
Private equity firms of the United States
Privately held companies based in Connecticut
Companies based in Stamford, Connecticut